The Samsung Galaxy M series is a line of online-exclusive budget smartphones manufactured by Samsung Electronics. The first models in the series, the Samsung Galaxy M10 and M20, were released on February 5, 2019; they were followed by the Samsung Galaxy M30 on March 7 and the Samsung Galaxy M40 on June 18. The Galaxy M10s and M30s were announced on September 18, and both were released on September 29. The Galaxy M01 and M11 were released on June 2 2020 and were available for sale on both online and offline platforms. On September 10, Samsung announced the Galaxy M51, the first upper mid-range model in the lineup.

The primary selling point of the lineup is the high-capacity battery and multi-lens camera setup, following the common trend within budget smartphones in 2019. It is positioned below the more streamlined, mid-range Galaxy A series, although the newer, higher-end models were derived from the A series with several alterations.

Description 
Being positioned at the mid-range and low-end segments, all models in the series have the all essential features of an entry-level smartphone, besides some other advanced features, thus differentiating them from other series and also differ in size and design. Samsung targets Asian developing markets or the European entry-level market with the lineup as a response to the growing popularity of budget smartphones offered by Chinese manufacturers such as Xiaomi, Huawei and BBK Electronics.

Phones

2019 lineup (1st generation)

2020 lineup (2nd generation)

2021 lineup (3rd generation)

2022 lineup (4th generation)

2023 lineup (5th generation)

References 

Samsung mobile phones
Samsung Galaxy
Android (operating system) devices
Samsung mobile series